Biokoviella is a genus of millipedes belonging to  family Anthogonidae in order Chordeumatida. Adult millipedes have 30 segments (counting the collum as the first segment and the telson as the last).

Species

The genus contains two recognised species:

Biokoviella mauriesi 
Biokoviella mosorensis 

The genus was formerly assigned to the monotypic family Biokoviellidae, but is now treated as a monotypic subfamily in family Anthogonidae.

References

Chordeumatida